Harry Cohn (July 23, 1891 – February 27, 1958) was a co-founder, president, and production director of Columbia Pictures Corporation.

Life and career
Cohn was born to a working-class Jewish family in New York City. His father, Joseph Cohn, was a tailor from Germany, and his mother, Bella Joseph, was from Pale of Settlement, Russian Empire. He left school early and had a variety of jobs, including chorus boy, fur salesman, pool hustler, shipping clerk, streetcar conductor and song plugger for a sheet music printer. He also appeared in a vaudeville act with Harry Ruby.

He entered the film industry when he got a job with Independent Moving Pictures (which had recently merged to become part of Universal Film Manufacturing Company), where his elder brother, Jack Cohn, was already employed. The brothers made their first film there, Traffic in Souls. Cohn became personal secretary to Universal president, Carl Laemmle.

In 1919, Cohn joined his brother and fellow IMP employee Joe Brandt, to found CBC Film Sales Corporation. The initials officially stood for Cohn, Brandt, and Cohn, but Hollywood wags noted the company's low-budget, low-class efforts and nicknamed CBC "Corned Beef and Cabbage." Harry Cohn managed the company's film production in Hollywood, while his brother managed its finances from New York. The relationship between the two brothers was not always good, and Brandt, finding the partnership stressful, eventually sold his third of the company to Harry, who took over as president, by which time the firm had been renamed Columbia Pictures Corporation.

Most of Columbia's early work was action fare starring rock-jawed leading man Jack Holt. Columbia was unable to shake off its stigma as a Poverty Row studio until 1934, when director Frank Capra's Columbia comedy It Happened One Night swept the Academy Awards. Exhibitors who formerly wouldn't touch Columbia product became steady customers. As a horizontally integrated company that only controlled production and distribution, Columbia had been at the mercy of theater owners. Columbia expanded its scope to offer moviegoers a regular program of economically made features, short subjects, serials, travelogues, sports reels, and cartoons. Columbia released a few "class" productions each year (Lost Horizon, Holiday, Mr. Smith Goes to Washington, The Jolson Story, Gilda, All the King's Men, etc.), but depended on its popular "budget" productions to keep the company solvent. During Cohn's tenure, the studio always turned a profit.

Cohn did not build a stable of movie stars like other studios. Instead, he generally signed actors who usually worked for more expensive studios (Wheeler & Woolsey, Cary Grant, Katharine Hepburn, Mae West, Humphrey Bogart, Dorothy Lamour, Mickey Rooney, Chester Morris, Warren William, Warner Baxter, Sabu, Gloria Jean, Margaret O'Brien, etc.) to attract a pre-sold audience. Columbia's own stars generally rose from the ranks of small-part actors and featured players (Jean Arthur, Rita Hayworth, Larry Parks, Julie Bishop, Lloyd Bridges, Bruce Bennett, Jock Mahoney, etc.). Some of Columbia's producers and directors also graduated from lesser positions as actors, writers, musicians, and assistant directors.

Cohn was known for his autocratic and intimidating management style. When he took over as Columbia's president, he remained production chief as well, thus concentrating enormous power in his hands. He respected talent above any personal attribute, but he made sure his employees knew who was boss. Writer Ben Hecht referred to him as "White Fang". An employee of Columbia called him "as absolute a monarch as Hollywood ever knew." It was said "he had listening devices on all sound stages and could tune in any conversation on the set, then boom in over a loudspeaker if he heard anything that displeased him." Throughout his tenure, his most popular moniker was "King Cohn."

Moe Howard of the Three Stooges recalled that Cohn was "a real Jekyll-and-Hyde-type guy... socially, he could be very charming." Cohn was known to scream and curse at actors and directors in his office all afternoon, and greet them cordially at a dinner party that evening. There is some suggestion that Cohn deliberately cultivated his reputation as a tyrant, either to motivate his employees or simply because it increased his control of the studio. Cohn is said to have kept a signed photograph of Benito Mussolini, whom he met in Italy in 1933, on his desk until the beginning of World War II. (Columbia produced the documentary Mussolini Speaks in 1933, narrated by Lowell Thomas.) Cohn also had a number of ties to organized crime. He had a long-standing friendship with Chicago mobster John Roselli, and New Jersey mob boss Abner Zwillman was the source of the loan that allowed Cohn to buy out his partner Brandt. Cohn's brash, loud, intimidating style has become Hollywood legend and was reportedly portrayed in various movies. The characters played by Broderick Crawford in All The King's Men (1949) and Born Yesterday (1950), both Columbia pictures, are allegedly based on Cohn, as is Jack Woltz, a movie mogul who appears in The Godfather (1972) as well as Rod Steiger in The Big Knife.

In his own way, Harry Cohn was sentimental about certain professional matters. He remembered the valuable contributions of Jack Holt during Columbia's struggling years, and kept him under contract until 1941. Cohn hired the Three Stooges in 1934 and, according to Stooge Larry Fine, "he thought we brought him luck." Cohn kept the Stooges on his payroll until the end of 1957. Cohn was fond of what he termed "those lousy little 'B' pictures", and kept making them, along with two-reel comedies and serials, after other studios had abandoned them.

According to biographer Michael Fleming, Cohn forced Curly Howard of the Stooges to keep working after suffering a series of minor strokes, which possibly contributed to a further deterioration of Howard's health and his eventual retirement and early death, though some people speculated that this was not true. Cohn was responsible for the abrupt end to Hazel Scott's film career after Scott protested the degrading costumes black women were scripted to wear on Mae West's 1943 film The Heat's On.  Cohn eventually relented, but made good on his vow that Hazel Scott would never step foot on a Hollywood studio as long as he lived.

Legal issues

Sexual abuse allegations
According to multiple accounts, Cohn asked for and expected sex from virtually all of his female stars in exchange for employment. According to writer Joseph McBride, Jean Arthur quit the film industry when her Columbia Pictures' contract expired in 1944 because Cohn was known to sexually assault actresses. When Joan Crawford was subjected to Cohn's advances after signing a three-picture contract with Columbia, she quickly stopped him by saying "Keep it in your pants, Harry. I'm having lunch with Joan [his wife] and the boys [his children] tomorrow."

Rita Hayworth's relationship with Cohn was fraught with aggravation. Her biography If This Was Happiness, describes how Cohn was angered when she refused his demands to sleep with him. However, he kept her under contract because she made him money. During these Columbia years, each did their best to irritate the other despite their successful working relationship. Cohn tried to groom Mary Castle as Hayworth's successor.

Allegations of mob connections
According to one account, in 1957 Cohn threatened Sammy Davis Jr. with mob violence because he was romantically involved with actress Kim Novak, who was then under contract with Columbia Pictures. As Davis was black and Novak white, Cohn was worried any backlash against the interracial relationship could hurt the studio. There are several differing accounts of what actually occurred, but they agree that Davis was threatened by organized crime figures associated with Cohn. 

According to one account, Cohn called racketeer John Roselli, who was instructed to inform Davis that he must stop seeing Novak. Attempting to scare Davis, Roselli had him kidnapped, then released after a few hours. Another account relates that the threat was conveyed to Davis's father by mobster Mickey Cohen. Davis was threatened with the loss of his other eye or a broken leg if he did not marry a black woman within two days. Davis sought the protection of Chicago mobster Sam Giancana, who said that he could protect him in Chicago and Las Vegas but not California.

Cohn was one of the influences (as well as MGM mogul  Louis B. Mayer) for the character of studio boss Jack Woltz in the 1972 crime film The Godfather.

Personal life
Cohn was married to Rose Barker from 1923 to 1941, and to actress Joan Perry (1911–1996) from July 1941 until his death in 1958.

His brothers all worked at Columbia. As well as co-founder Jack, the eldest brother Maxwell was a shorts subject producer and Nathan was the New York division manager. Cohn's nephew, Ralph, one of Jack Cohn's three sons, founded Screen Gems. Another of Jack's sons, Robert, was also a Columbia executive. Maxwell's daughter was Leonore "Lee" Cohn Annenberg, the wife of billionaire publishing magnate Walter Annenberg of Philadelphia.

Death
Cohn had been suffering from an enlarged heart and suffered a heart attack while flying back from New York in December 1957 and was told to slow down. In February 1958 he suffered another heart attack at the Arizona Biltmore Hotel in Phoenix, Arizona, shortly after having finished dinner, and died in an ambulance en route to St. Joseph's Hospital.

Practically the entire Hollywood community attended Cohn's extravagant funeral on stage 12 at the Columbia studios  where Red Skelton made the famous (possibly apocryphal) quote: "It proves what Harry always said: Give the public what they want and they'll come out for it." Cohn is interred in the Hollywood Forever Cemetery in Hollywood.

Media portrayal
Cohn was portrayed by Michael Lerner in the 1983 TV film Rita Hayworth: The Love Goddess and by Eric Roberts in the 2018 film Frank & Ava.

References

Sources
 Bob Thomas, King Cohn
 Bernard F. Dick, The Merchant Prince of Poverty Row

External links

Film producers from New York (state)
American film studio executives
American film production company founders
Film producers from California
1891 births
1958 deaths
Columbia Pictures people
Businesspeople from Los Angeles
Burials at Hollywood Forever Cemetery
American people of Russian-Jewish descent
American people of German-Jewish descent
Businesspeople from New York City
20th-century American businesspeople
Presidents of Columbia Pictures